This is a list of Tanzanian writers.

 Agoro Anduru (1948–1992), short story writer
 Mark Behr (1963– ), fiction writer also connected with South Africa
 Fadhy Mtanga (1981– ) novelist, poet and photographer 
 Abdulrazak Gurnah (1948– ), novelist and critic 
 Ebrahim N. Hussein (1943– ), playwright, essayist, poet and translator  
 Prince Kagwema (1931– ), novelist
 Euphrase Kezilahabi (1944–2020), novelist, poet and scholar
 Jacqueline Massawe, poet
 Aniceti Kitereza (1896–1981), novelist
 Elieshi Lema (1949– ), novelist, children's author and publisher
 Amandina Lihamba (1944– ), playwright
 Ismael R. Mbise, novelist and academic
 Penina Mlama (1948– ), playwright
 Sandra A. Mushi (1974– ), fiction writer, poet
 Elvis Musiba (died 2010), businessman and Swahili novelist
 Godfrey Mwakikagile (1949– ), writer and specialist in African studies
 Christopher Mwashinga (1965– ), poet, Christian non-fiction writer, and essayist
 Ras Nas, musician and poet
 Julius Nyerere (1922–1999), politician and writer
 Nancy Sumari, children's book author and publisher 
 Peter Palangyo (1939–1993), novelist  
 Hammie Rajab, Swahili novelist
 Shaaban Robert (1909–1962), Swahili novelist and poet
 Emily Ruete (1844–1924), Princess of Zanzibar
 Gabriel Ruhumbika (1938– ), novelist and short story writer 
 Edwin Semzaba, novelist, playwright, actor and director
 Robert Bin Shaaban (1902–1962), poet, author and essayist
 Shafi Adam Shafi, Swahili novelist
 Erica Sugo Anyadike, writer of short stories
Richard Mabala, writer of short stories, Columnist and poet (1949– )
Joseph Marwa, novelist, poet and actor (1999– )
Nahida Esmail, writer of short stories and social activist

See also
 Tanzanian literature
List of African writers by country
List of Tanzanians

References

Tanzanian
Writers